A pattern is a regularity in the world, in human-made design, or in abstract ideas. As such, the elements of a pattern repeat in a predictable manner. A geometric pattern is a kind of pattern formed of geometric shapes and typically repeated like a wallpaper design.

Any of the senses may directly observe patterns. Conversely, abstract patterns in science, mathematics, or language may be observable only by analysis. Direct observation in practice means seeing visual patterns, which are widespread in nature and in art. Visual patterns in nature are often chaotic, rarely exactly repeating, and often involve fractals. Natural patterns include spirals, meanders, waves, foams, tilings, cracks, and those created by symmetries of rotation and reflection. Patterns have an underlying mathematical structure; indeed, mathematics can be seen as the search for regularities, and the output of any function is a mathematical pattern. Similarly in the sciences, theories explain and predict regularities in the world.

In art and architecture, decorations or visual motifs may be combined and repeated to form patterns designed to have a chosen effect on the viewer. In computer science, a software design pattern is a known solution to a class of problems in programming. In fashion, the pattern is a template used to create any number of similar garments.

In many areas of the decorative arts, from ceramics and textiles to wallpaper, "pattern" is used for an ornamental design that is manufactured, perhaps for many different shapes of object.

Nature 

Nature provides examples of many kinds of pattern, including symmetries, trees and other structures with a fractal dimension, spirals, meanders, waves, foams, tilings, cracks and stripes.

Symmetry 

Symmetry is widespread in living things. Animals that move usually have bilateral or mirror symmetry as this favours movement. Plants often have radial or rotational symmetry, as do many flowers, as well as animals which are largely static as adults, such as sea anemones. Fivefold symmetry is found in the echinoderms, including starfish, sea urchins, and sea lilies.

Among non-living things, snowflakes have striking sixfold symmetry: each flake is unique, its structure recording the varying conditions during its crystallisation similarly on each of its six arms. Crystals have a highly specific set of possible crystal symmetries; they can be cubic or octahedral, but cannot have fivefold symmetry (unlike quasicrystals).

Spirals 

Spiral patterns are found in the body plans of animals including molluscs such as the nautilus, and in the phyllotaxis of many plants, both of leaves spiralling around stems, and in the multiple spirals found in flowerheads such as the sunflower and fruit structures like the pineapple.

Chaos, turbulence, meanders and complexity 

Chaos theory predicts that while the laws of physics are deterministic, there are events and patterns in nature that never exactly repeat because extremely small differences in starting conditions can lead to widely differing outcomes. The patterns in nature tend to be static due to dissipation on the emergence process, but when there is interplay between injection of energy and dissipation there can arise a complex dynamic. Many natural patterns are shaped by this complexity, including vortex streets, other effects of turbulent flow such as meanders in rivers. or nonlinear interaction of the system

Waves, dunes 

Waves are disturbances that carry energy as they move. Mechanical waves propagate through a medium – air or water, making it oscillate as they pass by. Wind waves are surface waves that create the chaotic patterns of the sea. As they pass over sand, such waves create patterns of ripples; similarly, as the wind passes over sand, it creates patterns of dunes.

Bubbles, foam 

Foams obey Plateau's laws, which require films to be smooth and continuous, and to have a constant average curvature. Foam and bubble patterns occur widely in nature, for example in radiolarians, sponge spicules, and the skeletons of silicoflagellates and sea urchins.

Cracks 

Cracks form in materials to relieve stress: with 120 degree joints in elastic materials, but at 90 degrees in inelastic materials. Thus the pattern of cracks indicates whether the material is elastic or not. Cracking patterns are widespread in nature, for example in rocks, mud, tree bark and the glazes of old paintings and ceramics.

Spots, stripes

Alan Turing, and later the mathematical biologist James D. Murray and other scientists, described a mechanism that spontaneously creates spotted or striped patterns, for example in the skin of mammals or the plumage of birds: a reaction–diffusion system involving two counter-acting chemical mechanisms, one that activates and one that inhibits a development, such as of dark pigment in the skin. These  spatiotemporal patterns slowly drift, the animals' appearance changing imperceptibly as Turing predicted.

Art and architecture

Tilings 

In visual art, pattern consists in regularity which in some way "organizes surfaces or structures in a consistent, regular manner." At its simplest, a pattern in art may be a geometric or other repeating shape in a painting, drawing, tapestry, ceramic tiling or carpet, but a pattern need not necessarily repeat exactly as long as it provides some form or organizing "skeleton" in the artwork. In mathematics, a tessellation is the tiling of a plane using one or more geometric shapes (which mathematicians call tiles), with no overlaps and no gaps.

Zentangles 
The concept and process of Zentangles, a blend of meditative Zen practice with the purposeful drawing of repetitive patterns or artistic tangles has been trademarked by Rick Roberts and Maria Thomas. The process, using patterns such as cross hatching, dots, curves and other mark making, on small pieces of paper or tiles which can then be put together to form mosaic clusters, or shaded or coloured in, can, like the doodle, be used as a therapeutic device to help to relieve stress and anxiety in children and adults.  Zentangles comprising relevant or irrelevant shapes can be drawn within the outline of an animal, human or object to provide texture and interest.

In architecture

In architecture, motifs are repeated in various ways to form patterns. Most simply, structures such as windows can be repeated horizontally and vertically (see leading picture). Architects can use and repeat decorative and structural elements such as columns, pediments, and lintels. Repetitions need not be identical; for example, temples in South India have a roughly pyramidal form, where elements of the pattern repeat in a fractal-like way at different sizes.

See also: pattern book.

Science and mathematics 

Mathematics is sometimes called the "Science of Pattern", in the sense of rules that can be applied wherever needed. For example, any sequence of numbers that may be modeled by a mathematical function can be considered a pattern. Mathematics can be taught as a collection of patterns.

Fractals 

Some mathematical rule-patterns can be visualised, and among these are those that explain patterns in nature including the mathematics of symmetry, waves, meanders, and fractals. Fractals are mathematical patterns that are scale invariant. This means that the shape of the pattern does not depend on how closely you look at it. Self-similarity is found in fractals. Examples of natural fractals are coast lines and tree shapes, which repeat their shape regardless of what magnification you view at. While self-similar patterns can appear indefinitely complex, the rules needed to describe or produce their formation can be simple (e.g. Lindenmayer systems describing tree shapes).

In pattern theory, devised by Ulf Grenander, mathematicians attempt to describe the world in terms of patterns. The goal is to lay out the world in a more computationally friendly manner.

In the broadest sense, any regularity that can be explained by a scientific theory is a pattern. As in mathematics, science can be taught as a set of patterns.

Computer science 

In computer science, a software design pattern, in the sense of a template, is a general solution to a problem in programming. A design pattern provides a reusable architectural outline that may speed the development of many computer programs.

Fashion 

In fashion, the pattern is a template, a technical two-dimensional tool used to create any number of identical garments. It can be considered as a means of translating from the drawing to the real garment.

See also 
 Archetype
 Cellular automata
 Form constant
 Fractal
 Pattern (sewing)
 Pattern coin
 Pattern matching
 Pattern recognition
 Pattern (casting)
 Patterns in nature
 Pedagogical patterns

References

Bibliography

In nature 

 Adam, John A. Mathematics in Nature: Modeling Patterns in the Natural World. Princeton, 2006.
 Ball, Philip The Self-made Tapestry: Pattern Formation in Nature. Oxford, 2001.
 Edmaier, Bernhard Patterns of the Earth. Phaidon Press, 2007.
 Haeckel, Ernst Art Forms of Nature. Dover, 1974.
 Stevens, Peter S. Patterns in Nature. Penguin, 1974.
 Stewart, Ian. What Shape is a Snowflake? Magical Numbers in Nature. Weidenfeld & Nicolson, 2001.
 Thompson, D'Arcy W.  On Growth and Form. 1942 2nd ed. (1st ed., 1917).

In art and architecture  

 Alexander, C. A Pattern Language: Towns, Buildings, Construction. Oxford, 1977.
 de Baeck, P. Patterns. Booqs, 2009.
 Garcia, M. The Patterns of Architecture. Wiley, 2009. 
 Kiely, O. Pattern. Conran Octopus, 2010.
 Pritchard, S. V&A Pattern: The Fifties. V&A Publishing, 2009.

In science and mathematics 

 Adam, J. A. Mathematics in Nature: Modeling Patterns in the Natural World. Princeton, 2006.
 Resnik, M. D. Mathematics as a Science of Patterns. Oxford, 1999.

In computing 

 Gamma, E., Helm, R., Johnson, R., Vlissides, J. Design Patterns. Addison-Wesley, 1994.
 Bishop, C. M. Pattern Recognition and Machine Learning. Springer, 2007.

Concepts in epistemology
Concepts in metaphysics
Concepts in the philosophy of mind
Concepts in the philosophy of science
Design